"It Must Be Jelly ('Cause Jam Don't Shake Like That)" is a 1942 jazz and pop song recorded by Glenn Miller and His Orchestra. The song was released as an RCA 78 single by Glenn Miller in 1944. Woody Herman also released the song as a single and as a V-Disc.

Background
The music for Glenn Miller's version was written by J.C. Chummy MacGregor and George "The Fox" Williams and the lyrics by Sunny Skylar. George Williams also arranged the song. A version was also recorded by the Army Air Force band under Glenn Miller. Sheet music was published in the U.S. by Mutual Music Society, Inc., New York, N.Y. In the UK, the sheet music was published by Chappell & Co., Ltd., London. The March 23, 1944 Woody Herman studio recording in New York featured the additional lyrics written by Sunny Skylar and sung by Woody Herman and Frances Wayne.

The expression "It must be jelly 'cause jam don't shake like that" or variations of it was a popular slang phrase. There had been earlier songs that used a similar phrase: "It Must Be Jelly ('Cause Jam Don't Shake That Way)" by The Hipp Cats, recorded on August 13, 1938, and the 1940 song "Jam Don't Shake" by Frankie "Half-Pint" Jaxon. The lyrics and the music, however, are completely different in all three songs.

The song was first recorded on July 15, 1942 by Glenn Miller and His Orchestra at Victor Studios, Chicago, Illinois, in a Wednesday session that lasted from 11:00 am to 3:15 pm in one take. The 1942 lyrics to the song as recorded by Glenn Miller were: "It must be jelly 'cause jam don't shake like that / It must be jelly 'cause jam don't shake like that / Oh Mama, you're so big and fat!"

The Glenn Miller civilian band played the same arrangement that was performed at least twice, available on a Victor 78 recording, Victor 20-1546-A, recorded July 15, 1942. There is also a version taken from a radio remote broadcast from September 15, 1942 in Boston, Massachusetts and later re-released by RCA Victor on LPT 6700.

"It Must Be Jelly ('Cause Jam Don't Shake Like That)" was the first song performed on the October 16, 1943 I Sustain the Wings radio program with the Army Air Force Band.

The 78 single, Victor 20-1546, reached number twelve on the Billboard charts in January, 1944, where it stayed for eight weeks on the charts. Moreover, the record was a crossover hit, reaching number two on the Billboard 'Harlem' Hit Parade Chart on February 19, 1944, the then equivalent of the later R&B chart, and number sixteen on the Billboard Juke Box Chart.

An ad for the RCA Victor release appeared in the December 11, 1943 Billboard magazine.

Personnel

On trombones: Glenn Miller, Jimmy Priddy, Paul Tanner, Frank D’Annolfo. On trumpets: Billy May, Steve Lipkins, Dale McMickle, Johnny Best. On reeds: Lloyd “Skippy” Martin, as; Ernie Caceres, as, bar & clt; Wilbur Schwartz, clt & as; Tex Beneke, ts; Al Klink, ts. Rhythm: Chummy MacGregor, p; Bobby Hackett, g; Doc Goldberg, b; and, Maurice Purtill, d.

The vocals were by The Modernaires, consisting of Ralph Brewster, Bill Conway, Hal Dickinson, Chuck Goldstein, and Paula Kelly.

Other Recordings
thumb|1944 UK sheet music cover, Chappell & Co., Ltd., London.
Harry James, Johnny Long, Back Alley Hoodoo, and Frankie Ford also recorded versions. Woody Herman released a studio recording in 1944 on Brunswick and Decca Records in the UK as a 78 A side single, 03541, and on Coral Records in the U.S. as 60066, singing the Sunny Skylar lyrics in a duet with Frances Wayne. Ray McKinley performed the song with the New Glenn Miller Orchestra on the fourth episode of the 1961 TV series Glenn Miller Time''.

Wartime Release
The U.S. War Department released the Woody Herman studio recording as a U.S. Army V-Disc, No. 320B, in November, 1944. The recording was the studio release featuring Woody Herman and Frances Wayne in a duet on vocals.

In popular culture
The phrase was quoted in Episode 1 of Series 5 of Hancock's Half Hour, first broadcast on January 1, 1958. The character Sid James quotes it as he looks at Tony Hancock's new fan photos.

The phrase was used on the TV series Mork & Mindy. Mork, played by Robin Williams, says it to Mindy's grandmother while pretending to be an old man flirting with her in episode 11 of season 1, Old Fears, which originally aired in November, 1978.

The phrase was referenced on the TV series The Jeffersons. It was quoted by Carmen played by Roseanna Christiansen in Episode 7 of Season 8 which originally aired in November, 1981.

It was also quoted in the TV series, The Big Bang Theory (Episode 12, Season 2), by Penny, played by Kaley Cuoco, when referencing a comment made towards her by Howard, played by Simon Helberg.

Fred Sanford sings the phrase as he makes breakfast in the 12th Episode of the Second Season of Sanford and Son. 

American recording artist RuPaul used the line "Must be jelly, cause jam don't shake" in his 2012 single "Peanut Butter".

The line makes an appearance in the novelty song "Bras on 45" by British musician Ivor Biggun.

References

Sources

Flower, John (1972). Moonlight Serenade: A Bio-Discography of the Glenn Miller Civilian Band. New Rochelle, NY: Arlington House. .
Miller, Glenn (1943). Glenn Miller's Method for Orchestral Arranging. New York: Mutual Music Society. ASIN: B0007DMEDQ
Simon, George Thomas (1980). Glenn Miller and His Orchestra. New York: Da Capo paperback. .
Simon, George Thomas (1971). Simon Says. New York: Galahad. .
Schuller, Gunther (1991). The Swing Era: The Development of Jazz, 1930–1945, Volume 2. New York: Oxford University Press. .

External links
Online version. Archive.org. "It Must Be Jelly", track 3.
March 11, 1944 recording of "It Must Be Jelly" by Glenn Miller and the Army Air Force Band with vocals by The Glee Club for the Uncle Sam Presents radio program.

Glenn Miller songs
1940s jazz standards
1942 songs
Pop instrumentals
Jazz compositions
Songs written by Sunny Skylar
Songs with music by Chummy MacGregor